Nazz was an American rock band.

(The) Nazz may also refer to:

Nazz (album), the band's 1968 debut
Nazz (character), from the cartoon Ed, Edd n Eddy
"The Nazz", a 1952 comedy routine by Lord Buckley